Aries Spears  (born April 3, 1975) is an American stand-up comedian and actor from New Jersey. Spears was a regular on Fox's sketch comedy series MADtv, appearing in 198 episodes, making him the second longest-serving cast member on the show behind Michael McDonald. In 2011, he released a special called Aries Spears: Hollywood, Look I'm Smiling. He co-hosted for the AVN Awards in 2018.

Early life
Spears was born in Chicago, Illinois and moved to New York when he was two years old. His mother, Doris Spears, is a jazz singer. Spears moved to New Jersey at age 11 and attended Arthur M. Judd Elementary School. He became a comedian at 14, performing stand-up comedy in various comedy clubs in New York City. He was expelled for fighting during his sophomore year in North Brunswick Township High School in North Brunswick Township, at age 17. Spears started doing his own comedy routine around his hometown.

Spears said that his first stand-up comedy was doing impressions at the Uptown Comedy Club in Harlem, and Spears said that he recalls himself doing impressions of James Brown and Jack Nicholson during his first stand-up comedy.

Career

Early film and TV roles
Spears's first television appearance was on Russell Simmons's Def Comedy Jam, followed by It's Showtime at the Apollo (1987). He moved to Los Angeles in 1992, landed a recurring role on A Different World (1993) and became a regular at The Comedy Store, The Improv and The Laugh Factory. Other television credits include Crosstown Traffic, The Adventures of Brisco County, Jr. (1993) and Soul Train.

At 16, Spears landed a part in the film Malcolm X. Shortly thereafter, he was cast in a starring role opposite Glenn Frey in South of Sunset (1993). Spears's other film appearances include Home of Angels (1994), The Pest (1997), Jerry Maguire in which he played Teepee, brother of Rod Tidwell (1996), Out-of-Sync (1995), and The Proud Family (2003).

MADtv
He joined the cast of MADtv during its third season in 1997, and he left at the end of its 10th season in 2005. During his stay, he created characters such as comedian Belma Buttons (co-host of fictional BET show "Reality Check"), Dollar Bill Montgomery (a host of an urban parody of Politically Incorrect called "Real **********ing Talk with Dollar Bill Montgomery"), James Brown Jr. (co-host of Cabana Chat), and controversial rapper Emcee Esher. He is well known for his impressions of celebrities, including rappers Jay-Z, Kanye West, LL Cool J, DMX, and Snoop Dogg actors Robert De Niro, Al Pacino, Sylvester Stallone, Denzel Washington, and Arnold Schwarzenegger, as well as fellow comedians Eddie Murphy and Paul Mooney.

Celebrity impressions on MADtv

50 Cent
Flex Alexander
Wayne Brady
Bobby Brown
James Brown (sportscaster)
Kobe Bryant
Ray Charles
Sean "Diddy" Combs
Bill Cosby
Sammy Davis Jr.
Oscar De La Hoya
DMX
Snoop Dogg
Missy Elliott
Kevin Eubanks
Louis Farrakhan
Jamie Foxx
Redd Foxx
Stedman Graham
Bryant Gumbel
Evander Holyfield
Allen Iverson
Jesse Jackson
Michael Jackson
Kanye West
Jay-Z
Magic Johnson
Michael Jordan
Juvenile
R. Kelly
Alan Keyes
Chaka Khan
Don King
Martin Luther King Jr.
Queen Latifah
Martin Lawrence
Gerald Levert
Little Richard
LL Cool J
Malcolm X
Mase
MC Hammer
Paul Mooney
Eddie Murphy
Shaquille O'Neal
Bill "Bojangles" Robinson
Al Roker
Isabel Sanford
O. J. Simpson
Sisqó
Ruben Studdard
Mike Tyson
Denzel Washington
Mother Love

After MADtv
Spears appeared in a second season episode of Mind of Mencia, which parodied Jamie Foxx's role in Kanye West's music video for "Gold Digger." He appeared in the 2006 film Hood of Horror. Spears performed in the TV series The Underground and voiced the character Wizard Kelly in the animated television series The Proud Family.

Spears appeared in two episodes of Frank Caliendo's sketch comedy show Frank TV as Shaquille O'Neal.

He appeared alongside Cedric the Entertainer and other comedians in the All Star Comedy Jam in 2009.

His 2011 stand-up comedy special Aries Spears: Hollywood, Look I'm Smiling was shown on Showtime. According to Deadline Hollywood, Spears was expected to appear in the dark comedy feature film directed by Vladislav Kozlov The Immortalist in 2020, along with Franco Nero, Sherilyn Fenn, Paul Rodriguez, and Jeff DuJardin.

Sexual abuse allegation
On August 30, 2022, Spears and Tiffany Haddish were sued for alleged grooming and sexual abuse of two minors. The lawsuit details that the minors were recruited to film comedy skits, and were asked to perform sexually suggestive content. Spears's attorney stated "he isn't going to fall for any shakedown" in reference to Spears. That September, the accuser filed to have the claims against both dismissed with prejudice.

Discography
I Ain't Scared! Aries Spears [2 Discs] 2005

Filmography

Film

Television

Documentary

Comedy releases

References

External links
 

1975 births
Living people
Male actors from Chicago
Male actors from New Jersey
African-American male actors
African-American male comedians
American male comedians
American male film actors
American impressionists (entertainers)
American male television actors
American male voice actors
People from North Brunswick, New Jersey
American sketch comedians
Comedians from Illinois
20th-century American comedians
21st-century American comedians
Comedians from New York City
20th-century African-American people
21st-century African-American people